Frol is a former municipality in the old Nord-Trøndelag county, Norway.  The  municipality existed from 1856 until its dissolution in 1962.  The municipality was first known as Levanger landsogn and then in 1911 the name was changed to Frol.  The municipality included all the area surrounding the town of Levanger in what is now the municipality of Levanger in Trøndelag county.

History

The municipality was established as Levanger landsogn in 1856 when the old Levanger formannskapsdistrikt was divided into two municipalities the "town" (kjøpstad) and the "rural district" (landsogn).  The two municipalities were named Levanger kjøpstad (population: 1,017) and Levanger landsogn (population: 2,290).  On 28 November 1874, two uninhabited parts of the neighboring municipality of Skogn were transferred to Levanger landsogn by a royal resolution. On 13 November 1951, the Lillemarksbakkene area in Frol (population: 51) was transferred to the town of Levanger.  

During the 1960s, there were many municipal mergers across Norway due to the work of the Schei Committee. On 1 January 1962, the town of Levanger (population: 1,669) was merged with the neighboring municipalities of Frol (population: 3,774), Åsen (population: 1,939), and Skogn (population: 4,756) to form a new, larger municipality called Levanger.

Name
The original name of the municipality was Levanger, after the old Levanger farm since the first Levanger Church was built there.

In 1911, the name was changed to Frol to distinguish it from the neighboring town of Levanger. The new name came from the old Frol skipreide which was a medieval administrative division of Norway. The meaning of the old name is uncertain.

Government
While it existed, this municipality was responsible for primary education (through 10th grade), outpatient health services, senior citizen services, unemployment, social services, zoning, economic development, and municipal roads. During its existence, this municipality was governed by a municipal council of elected representatives, which in turn elected a mayor.

Municipal council
The municipal council  of Frol was made up of representatives that were elected to four year terms.  The party breakdown of the final municipal council was as follows:

Mayors
The mayors of Frol:

 1856–1859: Hans Severin Jelstrup
 1860–1865: Nils Støre 
 1866–1867: Thomas Christian Jelstrup 
 1868–1869: Carl Fredrik Okkenhaug 
 1870–1871: Martinus Aagaard
 1872–1877: Thomas Christian Jelstrup 
 1878–1879: Carl Fredrik Okkenhaug
 1880–1881: Thomas Christian Jelstrup
 1882–1883: Eliseus Heir (V)
 1884–1885: Johannes Floan (V)
 1886–1889: Peter Holst (V)
 1890–1895: Johannes Okkenhaug (V)
 1896–1899: Johannes Floan (V)
 1900–1901: Paul Okkenhaug (V)
 1902–1904: Johannes Munkeby (V)
 1905–1910: Godtvard Berg (V)
 1911–1913: Gustav Ertzgaard (H)
 1914–1922: Martin Stavrum (V)
 1923–1928: Petter Andreas Røstad (Bp)
 1929–1937: Karl Okkenhaug (V)
 1938–1940: Oddleiv Spillum (Bp)
 1941–1945: Karl Haug (NS)
 1945–1947: Oddleiv Spillum (Bp)
 1948–1959: Kristian Halsan (Ap)
 1960–1961: Tormod Johansen (Ap)

See also
List of former municipalities of Norway

References

Levanger
Former municipalities of Norway
1856 establishments in Norway
1962 disestablishments in Norway